The MacGregor 22 is an American trailerable sailboat that was designed by Roger MacGregor as a cruiser and first built in 1967.

The design was developed into the Venture 222 in 1971, with just some minor changes.

Production
The design was built by MacGregor Yacht Corporation in the United States from 1967 until 1975, but it is now out of production.

Design

The MacGregor 22 is a recreational keelboat, built predominantly of fiberglass, with wood trim. It has a masthead sloop rig, a raked stem, a nearly plumb transom, a folding transom-hung rudder controlled by a tiller and a lifting keel. It has positive foam flotation for safety. It displaces  and carries  of ballast.

The boat is normally fitted with a small  outboard motor for docking and maneuvering.

The design has sleeping accommodation for five people, with a double "V"-berth in the bow cabin, a straight settee and a drop-down dinette table that converts into a double berth in the main cabin. The galley is located on the port side at the companionway ladder. The galley is equipped with a two-burner stove and a sink. The enclosed head is located just aft of the bow cabin on the starboard side.

For sailing downwind the design may be equipped with an asymmetrical spinnaker.

Operational history
In a review SailRite wrote, "the MacGregor 22 was designed to provide the best accommodation for the money for a boat its size. The MacGregor 22['s] light displacement gives it great performance in light to moderate wind conditions."

See also
List of sailing boat types

References

External links
Photo of a MacGregor 22
Photo of a MacGregor 22

Keelboats
1960s sailboat type designs
Sailing yachts
Trailer sailers
Sailboat type designs by Roger MacGregor
Sailboat types built by the MacGregor Yacht Corporation